Cathy Jane Harvin (née Brand; December 31, 1953 – December 4, 2010) was an American Democratic politician and legislator from South Carolina.

Born to Janet and Hyman Brand in Quantico, Virginia, she graduated from the University of South Carolina in 1975. In 2006, she was elected to the South Carolina House of Representatives, from Summerton, South Carolina, serving until her death at the age of 56 from breast cancer at the Medical University of South Carolina hospital in Charleston.

A Presbyterian, she was survived by her parents, her daughter, a sister, and two nieces. She was predeceased by her husband, Charles Alexander Harvin, III, who died 2005, she succeeded him when she was appointed to the same seat.

References

American Presbyterians
People from Quantico, Virginia
People from Clarendon County, South Carolina
University of South Carolina alumni
Democratic Party members of the South Carolina House of Representatives
Women state legislators in South Carolina
Deaths from breast cancer
Deaths from cancer in South Carolina
1953 births
2010 deaths
21st-century American politicians
21st-century American women politicians